Patsy is a feminine (sometimes masculine) given name or nickname.

Patsy may also refer to:

Places
 Patsy, Missouri, a community in the United States
 Patsy, Comoros,  a village on the island of Anjouan in the Comoros

Entertainment
 Patsy (1917 film), directed by John G. Adolfi
 Patsy (1921 film), directed by John McDermott 
 The Patsy (1928 film), directed by King Vidor
 The Patsy (1964 film), starring Jerry Lewis
 Patsy (Monty Python), a character in the film Monty Python and The Holy Grail and the musical Spamalot
 PATSY Award, the Picture Animal Top Star of the Year

Science
 3310 Patsy, a main-belt asteroid

Other
 Patsy, a colloquial phrase with meaning and usage comparable to "fall guy"
 Patsy's, a New York City restaurant
 Patsy, a doll line created in 1928, sold by the Effanbee Doll Company (later the Tonner Doll Company)
 List of storms named Patsy, tropical cyclones worldwide with this name